Such Is Woman is a 1936 Mexican film. It stars Sara García.

Cast
 José Bohr		
 Barry Norton		
 René Cardona		
 Sara García
 Carmelita Bohr		
 Roberto Cantú Robert		
 Clifford Carr		
 Carmen Conde		
 Manuel Noriega

External links
 

1936 films
1930s Spanish-language films
Mexican black-and-white films
Mexican comedy-drama films
1936 comedy-drama films
Films directed by José Bohr
1930s Mexican films